The Eurasian spoonbill (Platalea leucorodia), or common spoonbill, is a wading bird of the ibis and spoonbill family Threskiornithidae. The genus name Platalea is from Latin and means "broad", referring to the distinctive shape of the bill, and leucorodia is from Ancient Greek leukerodios "spoonbill", itself derived from leukos, "white" and erodios "heron". In England it was traditionally known as the "shovelard", a name later used for the Northern Shoveller.

Taxonomy and systematics
A study of mitochondrial DNA of the spoonbills found that the Eurasian spoonbill is sister taxon to a clade containing the royal and black-faced spoonbills.

The Eurasian spoonbill has three subspecies:
 P. l. leucorodia – Linnaeus, 1758: nominate, occupies all the range except as below.
 P. l. balsaci – Naurois & Roux, 1974: found on the islands off the Banc d'Arguin, Mauritania.
 P. l. archeri – Neumann, 1928: found on the coasts of the Red Sea and Somalia.

Birds in Asia are sometimes separated as P. l. major.

Description
This species is almost unmistakable in most of its range. The breeding bird is all white except for its dark legs, black bill with a yellow tip, and a yellow breast patch like a pelican. It has a crest in the breeding season. Non-breeders lack the crest and breast patch, and immature birds have a pale bill and black tips to the primary flight feathers. Unlike herons, spoonbills fly with their necks outstretched. The Eurasian spoonbill differs from the African spoonbill with which in overlaps in winter, in that the latter species has a red face and legs, and no crest.

They are mostly silent. Even at their breeding colonies the main sounds are bill snapping, occasional deep grunting and occasional trumpeting noises.

Distribution and habitat
This species is found widely in Europe, Asia and Africa. In Europe, it breeds from the United Kingdom and Portugal in the west, locally through the continent; ranging north to Denmark and east to the Balkans and the Black Sea. In Asia, it breeds in a broad band across the central part of the continent, from the Black Sea to the Korean Peninsula, as well as Kuwait, southern Iraq, Iran, southern Pakistan, India and Sri Lanka. In Africa, it breeds locally in coastal Mauritania, but more widely along the Red Sea and Gulf of Aden coasts. Compared to birds breeding in warmer parts of Asia, in Africa and the Iberian Peninsula, they are largely residential birds or only move short distances locally; more northern breeders generally migrate south to overwinter in the northern half of Africa or warmer parts of Asia. However, some northern birds do remain in the general region during the winter, including the United Kingdom, Iberian Peninsula, France, the Mediterranean and other European areas.

Eurasian spoonbills show a preference for extensive, shallow wetlands with muddy clay and/or fine, sandy beds. They may inhabit any type of marsh, river, lake, floodplain, bog or mangrove swamp, be it fresh, brackish or saline water. They are especially attracted to locations with undisturbed islets (for nesting), with dense, riparian-emergent vegetation (e.g. reedbeds) and scattered trees/shrubs, especially willow Salix spp., oak Quercus spp. or poplar Populus spp.. Eurasian spoonbills may also frequent sheltered marine habitats during the winter, such as deltas, estuaries, tidal creeks and coastal lagoons.

Behaviour and ecology

Breeding
More northerly breeding populations are fully migratory but may only migrate short distances while other, more southerly populations are resident and nomadic or partially migratory. In the Palearctic, the species breeds in spring (e.g. from April) but in tropical parts of its range it times breeding to coincide with rainfall. Breeding is normally in single species colonies or in small single species groups amidst mixed-species colonies of other waterbirds such as herons, egrets and cormorants. Outside the breeding season Eurasian spoonbills forage singly or in small flocks of up to 100 individuals. Migration is usually conducted in flocks of up to 100 individuals.

Feeding
It may also take algae or small fragments of aquatic plants (although these are possibly ingested accidentally with animal matter). They use sideways sweeps of their beaks to filter out the tiny fish and shrimps.

Conservation
Overall, the Eurasian spoonbill is not threatened and the total population was estimated at 63–65,000 mature birds in 2015. In Europe, the population experienced a significant decreased between 1960 and 1990, but since then it has been increasing and was estimated to number  29,000 mature birds in 2020. For example, in the Netherlands, the population had reached a low point of less than 150 breeding pairs in 1968, but due to better habitat protection and bans of toxins like DDT it rapidly increased from the 1980s, reaching almost 3000 pairs by 2015. Up to the early 2000s, in Europe only the Netherlands, Spain, Austria, Hungary and Greece had sizeable breeding populations. The northernmost part of the Eurasian spoonbill's range is in Denmark where the first known breeding was in 1900. Through the 1900s, this breeding population was small and highly irregular, including long periods with none. The species became more thoroughly established in Denmark in 1996 (where a few birds, likely from the Netherlands, arrived and began breeding) and its population has since rapidly increased with multiple colonies; first passing 100 pairs in 2011, and with almost 600 pairs as of 2021. It is likely that this northward spread has been aided by increasing temperatures. In the United Kingdom, it was extirpated around 1668, although in the previous century it had been a widespread breeding species in southern England and Wales, even near London. There were breeding attempts again in the mid-1990s, with the first successful breeding in 1998. This culminated with the formation of a small colony of 6 breeding pairs at Holkham in Norfolk in 2010. In 2011, 8 breeding pairs nested, successfully fledging 14 young, and in 2018 the colony had increased to 28 breeding pairs.

Threats to the Eurasian spoonbill include habitat loss and degradation by drainage and pollution, it is especially adversely affected by the disappearance of reed swamps. In Greece disturbance from fishing once caused the population to decline, and human exploitation of eggs and nestlings for food has threatened the species in the past. Breeding colonies are highly vulnerable to general disturbances and predators like red fox. Consequently, colonies are often restricted to islands free of ground predators; however, in some places, pairs in mainland colonies may breed successfully by nesting off the ground in trees and bushes.

The research network Eurasian Spoonbill International Expert Group was formed in 1991. It made an action plan for the bird in 2008. In 2013 the group joined the Agreement on the Conservation of African-Eurasian Migratory Waterbirds.

Gallery

References

External links

 
 
 
 
 
 

Platalea
Birds of Eurasia
Articles containing video clips
Birds described in 1758
Taxa named by Carl Linnaeus